Calayan, officially the Municipality of Calayan, is a 3rd class municipality in the province of Cagayan, Philippines. According to the 2020 census, it has a population of 17,410 people.

Calayan is home to the Calayan rail, a flightless bird identified as a separate species in 2004 and endemic to Calayan Island.

Etymology 
The municipality's name came from the Ibanag language, literally mean "where laya (ginger) is abounded".

Geography
It is located in the Luzon Strait north of Luzon Island and south of Taiwan via Bashi Channel to Luzon Strait. The town is composed of four of the five major islands of the Babuyan Islands namely: Calayan, Camiguin, Dalupiri and Babuyan Island. Calayan Island is the largest of the Babuyan Islands. Fuga Island, the fifth island within the Babuyan Islands, is part of Aparri municipality despite being closer to Claveria.

It is the second district in the province of Cagayan and its 29th municipality.

Barangays
Calayan is politically subdivided into 12 barangays. These barangays are headed by elected officials: Barangay Captain, Barangay Council, whose members are called Barangay Councilors. All are elected every three years.

Climate 

Weather conditions are generally wet with heavy rainfall occurring during November and December. The cold winds are the northerly and north-easterly winds. The island is also affected by typhoons.  Calayan Island publishes tide tables and solunar tables, daily forecasts for high tides and low tides, other fishing-related data such as the lunar phase, tidal coefficient, sun and moon rising and setting times, hours of maximum fish activity and weather conditions. This data is also useful for all fishing operations in the Calayan Island, apart from navigation of other commercial and transport vessels.

Demographics

Economy

Government
Calayan, belonging to the second legislative district of the province of Cagayan, is governed by a mayor designated as its local chief executive and by a municipal council as its legislative body in accordance with the Local Government Code. The mayor, vice mayor, and the councilors are elected directly by the people through an election which is being held every three years.

Elected officials

Education
The Schools Division of Cagayan governs the town's public education system. The division office is a field office of the DepEd in Cagayan Valley region. The office governs the public and private elementary and public and private high schools throughout the municipality.

References
This article contains Public domain text from the U.S. Government Elihu Root collection of United States documents relating to the Philippine Islands (1906)

External links
[ Philippine Standard Geographic Code]

Babuyan Islands
Municipalities of Cagayan
Island municipalities in the Philippines